Lachesilla bernardi is a species of Psocoptera from the Lachesillidae family that can be found in Austria, Croatia, Cyprus, France, Greece, Hungary, Italy, Poland, Portugal, Romania, Spain, and Switzerland. It can also be found in Near East.

References

Lachesillidae
Insects described in 1938
Psocoptera of Europe